The 1990 Idaho gubernatorial election was held on November 6, 1990, to elect the Governor of the state of Idaho. Cecil Andrus, the Democratic incumbent, ran for an unprecedented fourth term. Roger Fairchild, a former state senate majority leader from Fruitland, won the Republican nomination in May, but was easily defeated in November by the popular Andrus.

This was the sixth consecutive win for the Democrats, which started with Andrus' first victory twenty years earlier in 1970. , this is the last time that a Democrat has been elected Governor of Idaho.

Primary elections
Primary elections were held on May 22, 1990.

Democratic primary

Candidate
Cecil Andrus, incumbent governor (unopposed)

Republican primary

Candidates
 Roger Fairchild, Fruitland executive, former state senator (majority leader)
 Rachel Gilbert, Boise, state senator, anti-wilderness activist
 Milt Erhart, Boise stockbroker

Results

General election

Campaign
Although Fairchild attempted to capitalize on his business experience and Andrus' veto of a bill passed by the state legislature severely restricting abortion earlier in the year, the incumbent's personal popularity in Idaho proved to be too much to overcome.

Results

See also
Governor of Idaho
List of governors of Idaho
Idaho gubernatorial elections

References

Gubernatorial
1990
1990 United States gubernatorial elections